Czerski is a surname. Notable people with the surname include:

Helen Czerski (born 1978), Physicist and oceanographer
Jan Czerski (1845–1892), Polish paleontologist
Johannes Czerski (1813–1893), German Roman Catholic priest
Stanisław Czerski (1777–1833), Polish Jesuit priest